The Maserati V8 engine family is a series of 90°, four-stroke, naturally-aspirated (later turbocharged), V8 engines, designed, developed and built by Italian manufacturer Maserati for almost 45 consecutive years. A racing variant first appeared in 1939, with the V8RI, and a road-going version was later introduced with the Maserati 5000 GT in 1959, and later ending with the Maserati 3200 GT, in 2002. It was later succeeded by (but not to be confused with) the Ferrari-Maserati engine; a separate engine, completely designed, developed and produced by Ferrari, but used in several Maserati models.

Applications

Maserati V8RI
Maserati 5000 GT
Maserati 450S
Maserati Ghibli
Maserati Bora
Maserati Quattroporte I
Maserati Quattroporte III
Maserati Indy
Maserati Mexico
Maserati Kyalami
Maserati Khamsin
Maserati Shamal
Maserati 3200 GT

Reference 

Maserati
Engines by model
Gasoline engines by model
V8 engines